is a Japanese professional tennis player. He has won 7 Challenger tournaments and achieved a career-high singles ranking of World No. 60 in October 2012. 

Ito reached the quarterfinals of 's-Hertogenbosch and Moscow in 2012 and Newport and Bogota in 2015.

Career

Junior career
As a junior, he compiled a 28–9 win–loss record in singles (and 14–9 in doubles), achieving a combined ranking of No.75 in the world in October 2006.

2007–09
Ito had won six ITF Futures events in Asian countries, and started to play mainly in ATP Challenger Tour since 2008. In November 2009, he reached first challenger final in Toyota, losing to Uladzimir Ignatik with straight sets. In ATP World Tour event, Ito received wildcard for his first ATP main draw at the 2008 Japan Open in Tokyo.

2010
In August, Ito claimed first challenger title in his career at Brasília by beating Izak van der Merwe in the final. After that, he reached third round of qualifying for the second straight year in 2010 US Open before losing to American Robert Kendrick. In later season, Ito earned men's singles bronze medal in 2010 Asian Games at Guangzhou, winning over defending champion Danai Udomchoke of Thailand in quarterfinals. He also earned men's team bronze medal. In Toyota challenger, he defeated his countryman Yuichi Sugita in the final to win second challenger title of the season.

2011
In April, Ito claimed his third challenger title in Recife after Tiago Fernandes withdrew before the finals, and he entered world's top 150 for the first time, climbing to no.133. The next month, he reached the Busan Challenger final. He defeated top seed Lu Yen-hsun in semifinal, but lost to Dudi Sela with three sets.

In American hard court season, Ito recorded his first ATP main draw win in Atlanta, winning over Michael Berrer in the first round. He fell in the second round to eighth seed Somdev Devvarman. He made his debut in Grand Slam tournament at 2011 US Open, losing to 25th seed Feliciano López in the first round. He took part in the Japan Open, and defeat Dudi Sela with three sets to proceed to the second round before losing to Australian Bernard Tomic. At the end of season, he successfully defended his title in Toyota where he beat Sebastian Rieschick in the final.

2012
Ito qualified for the Brisbane International, and got through the opening round against Benjamin Mitchell in straight sets. He received wildcard for 2012 Australian Open, and advanced to second round of the major tournaments for the first time, beating Italian Potito Starace with four sets. He was beaten by Nicolas Mahut in the next round. In March, Ito broke him into the top 100 for the first time, winning the Kyoto Challenger title by beating Malek Jaziri in final.

In spring clay court season, Ito reached the second round in Houston, winning over fellow Japanese Go Soeda. He was defeated by eventual champion Juan Mónaco. He faced world no.4 Andy Murray in the 2012 French Open first round, losing in straight sets. In grass court season, Ito reached the round two in Queen's Club, and made his first ATP quarterfinal in the UNICEF Open. He knocked out third seed Jürgen Melzer on the way, but he eventually lost to Benoît Paire in straight sets. He suffered a first-round loss to Łukasz Kubot in 2012 Wimbledon Championships.

Ito represented Japan at his maiden Olympics in London 2012. He competed in the singles competition, but fell in the first round to Milos Raonic of Canada in straight sets. In 2012 US Open, he lost to Matthew Ebden in opening round. Ito participated in the Japan Open with wildcard, and upset world no.12 Nicolás Almagro in first round. He lost in the second round to Dmitry Tursunov. He reached quarterfinal in the Kremlin Cup to mark his career-high ranking world no.60, beating Roberto Bautista Agut and Konstantin Kravchuk. He lost to eventual champion Andreas Seppi.

2013
Ito opened the season in Brisbane where he lost to qualifier John Millman in first round. He then entered into the 2013 Australian Open main draw, and got revenge over John Millman with five-setter. He was beaten by 28th seed Marcos Baghdatis in second round. After falling in the second round to Sergiy Stakhovsky at Montpellier, Ito competed in Indian Wells to make his Masters main draw debut, losing to Evgeny Donskoy in opening round. In the Miami Masters, he also was eliminated in the first round by Olivier Rochus.

In Asian swing, Ito participated in the ATP events of Tokyo and Shanghai, falling in the first round both events. Two weeks later, he reached final in the Melbourne Challenger, losing to top seed Matthew Ebden in three sets.

2014
In grass court season, Ito won through the qualifying at the 2014 Wimbledon Championships by beating Ričardas Berankis from two sets down. He lost to lucky loser Simone Bolelli in the first round. He then participated in Hall of Fame Tennis Championships and got through first round, but retired during the second round match.

Ito qualified for the 2014 US Open, and advanced to second round after his opponent, Steve Johnson, retired due to cramping. His run was ended by 19th seed Feliciano López in next match. In the Japan Open, Ito was given a wildcard and scored his career biggest win in the first round, beating top seed and reigning Australian Open champion Stan Wawrinka 7–5, 6–2. This was his first ever win over a top-5 player. He was beaten by unseeded Benjamin Becker in the second round. On the ATP Challenger Tour, Ito reached the finals of five tournaments, but lost in all matches.

2015
Ito started the season by playing in Chennai, and reached second round before losing to Guillermo García-López in three sets. After falling to 31st seed Martin Kližan in the 2015 Australian Open first round, he made it to final in the Hong Kong Challenger, being beaten by Kyle Edmund. He competed in the 2015 French Open main draw for the first time since 2012, but he was eliminated in the first round by 28th seed Fabio Fognini.

Ito went on to participate in the Topshelf Open as a qualifier, and beat Ričardas Berankis in the first round. He was ousted by Ivo Karlović in the next round. Ito bounced back from the failure to qualify for the Wimbledon by reaching the quarterfinal in Newport, defeating seventh seed Steve Johnson and Noah Rubin. He then made back to back quarterfinal appearances in the Colombia Open by beating Alejandro Gómez and Matthew Ebden before losing to eventual champion Bernard Tomic in straight sets.

2016
Ito qualified for the 2016 Australian Open main draw, losing to fellow qualifier Radek Štěpánek in the first round with four sets. In March, he won through the qualifying tournament of the Miami Open and recorded his first Masters main draw win after beating Nicolas Mahut in straight sets. He lost to 16th seed Gaël Monfils in the second round.

Challenger and Futures finals

Singles: 31 (15–16)

Doubles: 1 (0–1)

Singles performance timeline

References

External links
 
 
 
 Official Blog 

1988 births
Living people
Japanese male tennis players
Sportspeople from Mie Prefecture
Tennis players at the 2012 Summer Olympics
Olympic tennis players of Japan
Asian Games medalists in tennis
Tennis players at the 2010 Asian Games
Tennis players at the 2014 Asian Games
Asian Games bronze medalists for Japan
Medalists at the 2010 Asian Games
Medalists at the 2014 Asian Games
20th-century Japanese people
21st-century Japanese people